The Tulln Basin is a sedimentary basin north to the Eastern Alps, thrown up by the river Danube.

Geography
The Danube enters the basin at Krems an der Donau and it leaves at Korneuburg. The basin is a settled ground filled with tertiary sediments and rubbly deposits of the Danube and other rivers of the Alpine Foreland. Its fertile terraces are farmed with wheat, maize, potatoes and sugar beet.

References 

Geology of Austria
Sedimentary basins of Europe